was a Japanese composer, conductor, and orchestrator. He was best known for composing the music for the Dragon Quest franchise, along with several other video games, anime, film, and television shows. Classically trained, Sugiyama was considered a major inspiration for other Japanese game music composers and was active from the 1960s until his death from septic shock.

Sugiyama was also a council member of the Japanese Society for Rights of Authors, Composers, and Publishers (JASRAC), board member of the Japan Institute for National Fundamentals, and honorary chairman of the Japanese Backgammon Society. Prior to his death, he was given the Order of the Rising Sun and was named a Person of Cultural Merit by the Japanese government. He also engaged in politics and activism, such as the promotion of Japanese nationalism and the denial of Japanese war crimes.

Career

Early life and television career
Sugiyama was born in Tokyo, Japan, on April 11, 1931. While growing up, Sugiyama's home was filled with music, which ultimately inspired his passion. In high school, he began to write various small musical works. He attended the University of Tokyo and graduated with full honors in 1958. He then went into the reporting and entertainment sections of Nippon Cultural Broadcasting. He also joined Fuji TV as a director that same year. He left the station in 1965 to become a freelance director but had begun concentrating solely on musical composition and orchestration by 1968.

During the late 1970s and early 1980s, Sugiyama composed for several musicals, commercials, pop artists, animated movies, and television shows, such as Science Ninja Team Gatchaman: The Movie, The Sea Prince and the Fire Child, and Cyborg 009. He also assisted Riichiro Manabe with the composition for Godzilla vs. Hedorah, composing the record single of the soundtrack and conducting for some of the tracks.

Dragon Quest and other video games
Sugiyama's first contact with Enix was by a fan letter he wrote them regarding a PC shogi game in the early 1980s. After Enix's staff overcame the shock of receiving a handwritten postcard from a celebrity of Sugiyama's stature, they were so impressed by his depth of knowledge and appreciation of games that they decided to ask Sugiyama to create music for their games. Sugiyama started composing for the PC-8801, and was working for Enix at the time. His first project with the company was the 1986 game Wingman 2. Later that year, he composed for his first major project, Dragon Quest. His classical score for the game was considered revolutionary for console video game music.

Sugiyama was the one of the first video game composers to record with a live orchestra. In 1986, the CD, Dragon Quest I Symphonic Suite, was released, utilizing the London Philharmonic Orchestra to interpret Sugiyama's melodies. The soundtrack's eight melodies (Opening, Castle, Town, Field, Dungeon, Battle, Final Battle, and Ending) set the template for most role-playing video game soundtracks released since then, many of which have been organized in a similar manner.

In 1987, he composed for Dragon Quest II. Music from the first two Dragon Quest games was performed by one of first  game music concerts, "Family Classic Concert". It was arranged and conducted by Sugiyama himself and was performed by the Tokyo String Music Combination Playing Group on August 20, 1987, at Suntory Hall in Tokyo. "Dragon Quest I Symphonic Suite" and "Dragon Quest II Symphonic Suite" were performed. He subsequently held eighteen of them all across Japan.

From 1987 to 1990, Sugiyama continued to compose for various other Enix games. In 1991, he introduced a series of video game music concerts, five in all, called the Orchestral Game Concerts, which were performed by the Tokyo City Philharmonic Orchestra and Tokyo Symphony Orchestra. The performances included over eighteen different video game composers, such as Koji Kondo, Yoko Kanno, Nobuo Uematsu, Keiichi Suzuki, as well as Sugiyama himself. These concerts were held from 1991 to 1996; during this time, Sugiyama composed for other video games and arranged for some of them to be performed in the Orchestral Game Concerts.

In September 1995, Sugiyama composed the Dragon Quest Ballet. It premiered in 1996, and returned in 1997, 1999, 2001, and 2002. During those years, he also released several Dragon Quest Symphonic Suites. In late 2004, he finished and released the Dragon Quest VIII soundtrack. In 2005, Sugiyama was holding a series of concerts in Japan with the Tokyo Metropolitan Symphony Orchestra with music from Dragon Quest VIII, as well as his classic compositions from the past. In August 2005, his music from Dragon Quest was performed live at the European Symphonic Game Music Concert, marking the first time that his music was performed by a live symphonic concert outside of Japan. Sugiyama also composed the score for Dragon Quest X and its expansions, as well as Dragon Quest XI.

Throughout his work Sugiyama repeatedly used motifs to maintain a consistency and nostalgic quality in the different installments. Each of the Dragon Quest games that he worked on included a nearly identical, upbeat theme track titled "Overture". For over 30 years of his life, Sugimaya had composed more than 400 songs for the Dragon Quest series.  Sugiyama's style of composition has been compared to late Baroque and early Classical period styles. Sugiyama said that his process for making music for games was based on seeing initial drafts on its setting and story.

Sugiyama's non-work related hobbies included photography, traveling, building model ships, collecting old cameras, and reading. He has opened a camera section on his website, and also founded his own record label, SUGI Label, in June 2004. Sugiyama also composed the fanfares for the opening and closing of the gates at the Tokyo and Nakayama Racecourses. He was given the Order of the Rising Sun, 4th Class, by the Japanese government in 2018 before also being named a Person of Cultural Merit by them two years later. Sugiyama died from septic shock at the age of 90 on September 30, 2021. A television drama played by actor Ken Yasuda detailing Sugiyama's involvement with Dragon Quest aired on Nippon TV on August 27, 2022.

Political activities and beliefs
Sugiyama was a Nanjing Massacre denialist, stating that the facts regarding it are "selective in nature". He was one of the signatories on "The Facts", a full-page ad published by The Washington Post on June 14, 2007, which was written by a number of Japanese politicians and academics in response to the passing of United States House of Representatives House Resolution 121, which sought an official apology from the Government of Japan regarding their involvement of using "comfort women", which were women who were used as sexual slaves by Japanese soldiers during World War II. Sugiyama was also a board member of the Japan Institute for National Fundamentals.

In 2012, Sugiyama wrote an editorial saying that he thought Japan was in a state of "civil war between Japanese and anti-Japanese". Giving examples, he argued that the Japanese media portrayed acts of patriotism negatively, such as performing the National Anthem of Japan or raising the Japanese flag. In addition, he thought that the demands of the Japanese anti-nuclear movement, which grew following the Fukushima Daiichi nuclear disaster of 2011, to immediately dismantle all nuclear energy facilities without offering any alternative solutions damaged the country's ability to defend itself.

In 2015, Sugiyama made an appearance on the Japanese Culture Channel Sakura television program Hi Izuru Kuni Yori where he was shown agreeing with views shared by Japanese politician Mio Sugita who said there was no need for LGBT education in Japanese schools, as well as dismissing concerns about high suicide rates among the community. Sugiyama added that the lack of children born from LGBT couples was an important topic to discuss, also suggesting that Japan was more empowering to women than South Korea. He later recanted his statement by saying that LGBT couples have existed throughout human history and he supported the use of governments to occasionally help them.

Works

Video games

Film and television

Singles

References

External links
  

1931 births
2021 deaths
20th-century classical composers
20th-century classical pianists
20th-century conductors (music)
20th-century Japanese composers
20th-century Japanese male musicians
20th-century Japanese pianists
21st-century classical composers
21st-century classical pianists
21st-century conductors (music)
21st-century Japanese composers
21st-century Japanese male musicians
21st-century Japanese pianists
Anime composers
Anti-Korean sentiment in Japan
Conservatism in Japan
Japanese classical composers
Japanese classical pianists
Japanese conductors (music)
Japanese contemporary classical composers
Japanese film score composers
Japanese male classical composers
Japanese male classical pianists
Japanese male conductors (music)
Japanese male film score composers
Japanese music arrangers
Japanese nationalists
Japanese television composers
Male television composers
Musicians from Tokyo
Nanjing Massacre deniers
Persons of Cultural Merit
Recipients of the Order of the Rising Sun, 4th class
University of Tokyo alumni
Video game composers